Prahlad Gunjal is a former Member of the Legislative Assembly for Kota North, elected in 2013.

References

Year of birth missing (living people)
Living people
Bharatiya Janata Party politicians from Rajasthan